Campiglossa freyae is a species of tephritid or fruit flies in the genus Campiglossa of the family Tephritidae found in Argentina.

References

Tephritinae
Insects described in 1928
Diptera of South America
Taxa named by Erwin Lindner